Elcoteq SE was a Finnish consumer electronics contract manufacturer, EMS, and ODM company headquartered in Luxembourg. The company filed for bankruptcy protection in Luxembourg on October 6, 2011.

It was a manufacturer of the BlackBerry and also performed repair and refurbishment services.

History
Founded in 1984 as a microelectronics unit of the Lohja Corporation, the company became independent in an early 1990s management buyout.

Elcoteq made an IPO on the Helsinki Stock Exchange in November 1997.

It manufactured the ill-fated Microsoft Kin for Sharp Corporation in the late 2000s.

On October 6, 2011, Elcoteq filed for bankruptcy in Luxembourg. The loss of a major client, Nokia, to Asian sourcing outfits may have been a contributing cause.

Production base expansion
Its original production base was in Lohja, Finland, and in 1992 it established an Estonian base. By 1999 had expanded production to include non-European bases, too.

Name
Representing electronics, contract manufacturing, and technology, Elcoteq was the company's second choice after Finnish regulators would not allow it to register the name Mikrotec.

Clients
The first Elcoteq customers were Ericsson and Nokia. Other clients have included:
 Aastra
 Ascom
 EADS
 Funai
 Huawei
 Humax
 Marconi Electronic Systems
 Nokia Siemens Networks
 Philips
 Research In Motion
 Sharp Corporation
 Siemens
 Sony Ericsson
 Swissvoice
 Tellabs
 Thomson SA

Production bases
Elcoteq has had production bases in Brazil, China, Estonia, India, Hungary, Romania, and Mexico.

References

External links
 Official website

Electronics companies of Finland
Companies formerly listed on Nasdaq Helsinki